Ant Story is a 2013 Bangladeshi drama film directed by Mostofa Sarwar Farooki and starring Sheena Chohan, Noor Imran Mithu and others.

Plot
Everyday on the way back to his suburban home on the other side of the river, struggling young graduate Mithu keeps gazing at the dazzling city of Dhaka which is like a big pie. Everybody wants to have a stake in that pie. Mithu feels he is not properly equipped to win over his stake. So he starts to equip himself in an unusual and unethical fashion. He realizes when the world can not be changed according to his wish; it is easier to create a new customized world in his head! He embarks on a journey of faking, lying, and fantasizing. He feels the immense pleasure of creativity because 'truth is what one has while lies are what one creates'. It then turns out to be a dangerously 'creative' game of sex-lies-and videotape.

Cast
 Sheena Chohan as Rima
 Noor Imran Mithu as Mithu
 G. Sumdany Don as Ridwan
 Mukit Zakaria as Mithu

Production 
The film was produced by Chabial and Impress Telefilm.

Release 
In 2017 the movie was released on Netflix. On 13 July 2014, the movie had its North American Premiere at the Asian Film Festival, Dallas.

Critical reception
The film received mixed to positive reviews. The Daily Star wrote "with a small cast and a complex narrative, he delivers an ample plateful for the serious film connoisseur, but probably not for the average cinema-goer".

It was included in the Muhr AsiaAfrica programme at the Dubai International Film Festival.

References

2013 films
2013 comedy-drama films
Bengali-language Bangladeshi films
Bangladeshi comedy-drama films
Films scored by Hridoy Khan
Films directed by Mostofa Sarwar Farooki
2010s Bengali-language films
Films shot in Bangladesh
Films produced by Mostofa Sarwar Farooki
Impress Telefilm films